Cameron Palatas (born February 23, 1994), is an American actor. He is best known for playing a younger Gideon Malick in Marvel's Agents of S.H.I.E.L.D. and Kane in F the Prom.

Early life 
Cameron Palatas was born in San Pedro, California, on February 23, 1994. He is the younger brother of fellow actors Nick Palatas and Philip Palatas. His first acting job was with his family, including his brother Nick, as extras in a Walmart commercial.

Career 
Palatas had a recurring role in the 2013 mockumentary series Zach Stone Is Gonna Be Famous. He has since had minor roles in several Disney shows such as iCarly, A.N.T. Farm, and I Didn't Do It. In 2015, he starred in the Christian drama film Pass the Light, in which he played a high school senior who runs for U.S. Congress. That same year, he starred in the Lifetime film Double Daddy. In 2016, he starred in the third season of Marvel's Agents of S.H.I.E.L.D. as a younger version of Gideon Malick, reprising the role in the seventh season of the show in 2020. He starred in the 2017 comedy film F the Prom by Benny Fine.

Personal life
Palatas dated actress Ariel Winter around 2012, which attracted some controversy as he was 18 years old and she was 14 years old. Winter's mother filed statutory rape charges against Palatas in 2012, but the charges were soon dropped when Winter's sister Shanelle Workman became Winter's legal guardian and alleged that their mother had been physically and emotionally abusive, culminating in Winter receiving emancipation in 2015.

Filmography

Films

Television

Web

Video games

References

External links 

1994 births
21st-century American male actors
Living people
American male television actors
American male video game actors